Judah ben Solomon Taitazak was a Talmudist who lived at Salonica in the 15th and 16th centuries. He was the brother of Joseph ben Solomon and a member of the Taitazak family. He was the author of She'erit Yehudah (Salonica, 1599–1600), commentating and supplementing Joseph Caro's Bet Yosef, on the second volume of the Ṭurim.

Jewish Encyclopedia bibliography 
 David Conforte, Ḳore ha-Dorot, p. 34b;
 Moritz Steinschneider, Cat. Bodl. col. 1373.

Year of birth missing
Year of death missing
Talmudists
Rabbis from Thessaloniki
16th-century rabbis from the Ottoman Empire
Jews expelled from Spain in 1492